Chhayamoy or Chayamoy is a 2013 Bengali horror-comedy film directed by Haranath Chakraborty and based on Shirshendu Mukhopadhyay's novel of the same title. This was a children's film with supernatural elements in it. Debajyoti Mishra composed the music of the film.

Plot 
Indrajit is a UK based scholar. While working to preserve historical documents, he finds a parchment from which he learns about treasures hidden in an old Zamindar palace in Simulgarh, a village of West Bengal. Actually Indrajit is the descendant of the zamindar's family. He comes to the village and finds out the treasure. But a corrupt moneylender Gagan Sapui accuses him of robbery, beats him up, snatches all the treasures and throws him in a nearby forest. From there, Indra is rescued by Alankar, a simple and poor boy from the village. Together they retrieve the treasure from Gagan Sapui with the help of a noble ghost Chhayamoy, who was once the minister of the Zamindar family. Eventually, the fraud and the corrupt nature of Gagan Sapui is revealed to the entire village.

Cast 
 Gaurav Chakrabarty as Indrajit
 Sabyasachi Chakrabarty as Chhayamoy/Chandra Kumar
 Deepankar De as Gagan Sapui
 Paran Bandopadhyay as Gour Thakurda 
 Shantilal Mukherjee as Kali Kapalik
 Rituparna Sengupta as dancer
 Monu Mukherjee as Potol Ganguly
 Nimu Bhowmik as Natabar Ghosh
 Adhiraj Ganguly as Alankar
 Debesh Roychowdhury as Haripada
 Sudip Mukherjee as Lakkhan
 Chandu Chakraborty as Raja Mahendra Pratap

See also 
 Ashchorjyo Prodeep, 2013 Bengali film
 Ajab Gayer Ajab Katha, 1998 Bengali film

References 

Bengali-language Indian films
2010s Bengali-language films
Indian children's films
Films based on works by Shirshendu Mukhopadhyay
Indian fantasy drama films
Films directed by Haranath Chakraborty

External links